Taiberson Ruan Menezes Nunes (born 18 November 1993), simply known as Taiberson, is a Brazilian footballer who plays as a winger.

Club career
Taiberson was born in Alegrete, Rio Grande do Sul, and was an Atlético Paranaense youth graduate. On 11 July 2012, he made his first team debut, coming on as a late substitute for Marcelo Cirino in a 1–0 home win against Ipatinga for the Série B championship.

On 1 March 2013, Taiberson was loaned to América-RN until the end of the year. On 30 April, however, he returned to his parent club.

In April 2014, Taiberson was demoted by Furacão, and subsequently joined Internacional, club he already represented as a youth. Initially assigned to the under-23s, he made his first team – and Série A – debut on 9 November, replacing Nilmar in a 1–4 away loss against fierce rivals Grêmio.

On 29 November 2014, Taiberson scored his first professional goal, netting the first in a 3–1 home win against Palmeiras. On 18 December, he extended his contract for a further three seasons.

On 4 January 2016, Taiberson was loaned to fellow league team Ponte Preta, until December.

On 7 January 2020, Taiberson joined USL Championship side Rio Grande Valley FC.

Honours
Internacional
Campeonato Gaúcho: 2015

CSA
Campeonato Alagoano: 2018

References

External links

1987 births
Living people
People from Alegrete
Brazilian footballers
Association football forwards
Campeonato Brasileiro Série A players
Campeonato Brasileiro Série B players
Campeonato Brasileiro Série D players
Club Athletico Paranaense players
América Futebol Clube (RN) players
Sport Club Internacional players
Associação Atlética Ponte Preta players
Clube Náutico Capibaribe players
Esporte Clube Juventude players
Centro Sportivo Alagoano players
Veranópolis Esporte Clube Recreativo e Cultural players
Rio Grande Valley FC Toros players
Brazilian expatriate footballers
Expatriate soccer players in the United States
Brazilian expatriate sportspeople in the United States
Sportspeople from Rio Grande do Sul